WWD may refer to:

 Cape May Airport, in New Jersey, United States
 Westward Airways (Nebraska), a defunct American airline
 Wildwood (Amtrak station), in Florida, United States
 Women's Wear Daily, a fashion-industry trade journal
 Woolwich Dockyard railway station, in London
World Water Day, an annual observance day about freshwater
 World Wetlands Day, an annual observance day about wetlands
 Wrong-way driving, the act of driving a motor vehicle against the direction of traffic
 Walking with Dinosaurs, a documentary television miniseries